Uirapuru may refer to:

 Uirapuru or musician wren, a South American bird
 Uirapuru, Goiás, a municipality in the state of Goiás, Brazil
 Uirapuru (Villa-Lobos), an orchestral piece composed by Heitor Villa-Lobos
 Brasinca Uirapuru, a Brazilian automobile made in the 1960s
 Aerotec Uirapuru, a Brazilian military aircraft of the 1960s and 1970s